Czechoslovakia competed at the 1928 Summer Olympics in Amsterdam, Netherlands. 70 competitors (69 men and 1 woman) took part in 51 events in 14 sports.

Medalists

Aquatics

Diving

2 divers, both men, represented Czechoslovakia in 1928. It was the nation's 2nd appearance in the sport. Both men competed only in the 3 metre springboard event; neither reached the final. Balasz placed 4th in his semifinal group, just missing the top 3 needed to advance.

Swimming

One male swimmer represented Czechoslovakia in 1928. It was the nation's 3rd appearance in the sport, in which it had competed each time it appeared at the Games. Antoš had been a member of the 1924 team as well. He placed 3rd in the preliminary heats in both of his events, not advancing to the semifinals in either.

Water polo

Czechoslovakia competed in water polo for the third time in 1928. The team was defeated by Great Britain in the first round.

 Summary

Men's tournament

 Team roster

 Round of 16

Athletics

11 athletes, all men, represented Czechoslovakia in 1928. It was the nation's 3rd appearance in the sport, in which Czechoslovakia had competed each time it appeared at the Games. Kittel's 8th place in the men's 1500 metres was the best result for Czechoslovakian athletes in Amsterdam.

 Track and road events

 Field events

Boxing

3 boxers, all men, represented Czechoslovakia in 1928. It was the nation's debut appearance in the sport. Jan Heřmánek won the silver medal in the middleweight class; the other two boxers each lost their first bout.

Cycling

Four cyclists, all men and all road cyclists, represented Czechoslovakia in 1928. It was the nation's 3rd appearance in the sport, in which Czechoslovakia had competed each time the nation appeared at the Games. Honig had the best time of the team, placing 39th in the individual road race. The combined score of the top 3 placed them 11th among the 15 competing nations.

Road cycling

Equestrian

9 equestrians, all men, competed for Czechoslovakia in 1928. It was the nation's 2nd appearance in the sport. Czechoslovakia was one of 5 nations to have the maximum 3 riders in each event. František Ventura won gold in the individual jumping, Czechoslovakia's first equestrian medal. Emanuel Thiel, who had had the nation's best result in 1924 at 6th in the individual dressage, bettered his own performance to 5th in 1928.

Dressage

Eventing

Jumping

Fencing

Seven fencers, six men and one woman, represented Czechoslovakia in 1928. It was the nation's 3rd appearance in the sport, in which Czechoslovakia had competed each time it participated in the Games. It was the first time Czechoslovakia had a female fencer, Jarmila Chalupová. Chalupová had the most individual success of any Czechoslovakian fencer in 1928, reaching the semifinals.

Gymnastics

Bohumil Mořkovský, bronze medalist on Vault and 13th-place finisher in the Individual All-Around at the previous Olympics in Paris, died on July 16, 1928, less than a month before he could make a repeat Olympic appearance. 8 gymnasts, all men, represented Czechoslovakia in 1928. It was the nation's 3rd appearance in the sport as well as the Games. The team took the silver medal, 6.375 points behind Germany, with Ladislav Vácha having the best individual all-around result at 9th place. Vácha also won gold in the parallel bars and silver in the rings. Emanuel Löffler took two apparatus medals as well, the silver in the vault and bronze in the rings.

Artistic gymnastics

Modern pentathlon

Three pentathletes represented Czechoslovakia in 1928. It was the nation's 2nd appearance in the sport. Růžička had the best finish for Czechoslovakia to date, placing 30th.

Rowing

1 rower competed for Czechoslovakia in 1928. It was the nation's 2nd appearance in the sport, and 1st since 1920. Josef Straka, whose son would compete in the Olympics in 1972 and 1976, reached the third round in the single sculls before being eliminated.

Sailing

A single male sailor represented Czechoslovakia in 1928. It was the nation's 2nd appearance in the sport. Winter finished 18th in the preliminary round standings, not advancing to the final.

 Dinghy

Weightlifting

Six weightlifters, all men, represented Czechoslovakia in 1928. It was the nation's third appearance in the sport, in which Czechoslovakia had competed each time it appeared at the Olympics. Skobla, who had placed 8th in light heavyweight (−82.5 kg) in 1924, won the bronze medal in heavyweight (+82.5 kg) this time. This matched the nation's best-ever result in the sport to date.

Wrestling

Six wrestlers, all men, represented Czechoslovakia in 1928. All six competed in the Greco-Roman discipline. It was the nation's 3rd appearance in the sport as well as the Games. Jindřich Maudr won the nation's first Olympic medal in wrestling, taking silver in the bantamweight after reaching a de facto gold medal final against the German Leucht.

 Greco-Roman

References

External links
Official Olympic Reports
International Olympic Committee results database

Nations at the 1928 Summer Olympics
1928
Summer Olympics